Chief Sir Emeka Ananaba is a Nigerian politician. Ananaba served as the Deputy Governor of Abia State from 2011 to 2015 under Chief T. A. Orji.

Biography 

Ananaba was born on the 31 March 1945 at Obegu, in present day Ugwunagbo in Abia State.
He attended St. Peters Primary School Obegu from 1951 and 1959 before proceeding to the Kings College Lagos for his secondary education from 1959 to 1963.
He joined the military  in 1964 after graduating from secondary school by enrolling in the Nigeria Air Force Military Training School Kaduna.  He attended the Nigeria Military Training College Kaduna from 1965 to 1966.
He was commissioned as Second Lieutenant Nigeria Air Force 189 Combatant Regular Commission in July 1965.
During the Nigeria Civil War, he fought on the Biafra side. He commandeered the Biafran 8th Commando Brigade and rose to the rank of Lieutenant Colonel. After the war, Ananaba left the military to study Pharmacy at the University of Nigeria, Nsukka in 1971 and graduated with a B Pharm. in 1976. In 1983, he was made a Chief and a Knight in 2001.

References 

1945 births
Living people
People from Abia State
Deputy Governors of Abia State
Igbo politicians
Peoples Democratic Party (Nigeria) politicians